Daniel Fish (born 19 December 1990) is a Cardiff-born Welsh rugby union player. Originally a full-back, he played club rugby for the Cardiff Rugby  and Cardiff RFC, having previously played for Glamorgan Wanderers RFC. Fish was capped at Wales Under-20 level and played regularly as a fly-half. He retired professionally in 2021, but continues to play semi-pro rugby at Cardiff RFC.

References

External links
 

1990 births
Living people
Cardiff Rugby players
Glamorgan Wanderers RFC players
Rugby union players from the Vale of Glamorgan
Welsh rugby union players
Rugby union fullbacks